César Bejarano (born 28 June 1941) is a Paraguayan fencer. He competed in the individual sabre event at the 1976 Summer Olympics.

References

External links
 

1941 births
Living people
Paraguayan male sabre fencers
Olympic fencers of Paraguay
Fencers at the 1976 Summer Olympics
20th-century Paraguayan people